Thomas Muster was the defending champion but did not compete that year.

Albert Costa won in the final 7–6 (9–7), 6–3 against Félix Mantilla.

Seeds
A champion seed is indicated in bold text while text in italics indicates the round in which that seed was eliminated.

  Albert Costa (champion)
  Félix Mantilla (final)
  Andrea Gaudenzi (second round)
  Hernán Gumy (second round)
  Jiří Novák (first round)
  Gilbert Schaller (quarterfinals)
  Karim Alami (first round)
  Ctislav Doseděl (quarterfinals)

Draw

References
 1996 Campionati Internazionali di San Marino Draw

San Marino CEPU Open
1996 ATP Tour